Renato Laghi (born 8 December 1944) is an Italian racing cyclist. He won stage 19 of the 1977 Giro d'Italia.

References

External links
 

1944 births
Living people
Italian male cyclists
Italian Giro d'Italia stage winners
Place of birth missing (living people)
People from Faenza
Sportspeople from the Province of Ravenna
Cyclists from Emilia-Romagna